The Show Goes On was a variety show that aired in the United States on CBS Television from January 19, 1950, to January 16, 1952. The television program was the first starring role for the host Robert Q. Lewis. After the debut episode, the program was broadcast on alternate Thursdays at 8 p.m. Eastern Time.

Premise
The show featured celebrities who appraised new talent as they competed for actual nightclub and theater bookings. Performers who appeared on the program included singer Gloria Lane.

The opening theme, titled "The Show Goes On Opening", was composed by Raymond A. Bloch.

Production 
Lester Gottlieb was the producer, and Alex Leftwich was the director. Lou Meltzer was the writer, and Bloch led the orchestra. The program originated from WCBS-TV, and the sound was recorded for broadcast on radio. The radio version was broadcast on Fridays at 8 p.m. E.T. from January 20, 1950, until July 4, 1950.

See also
1951-52 United States network television schedule

References

External links
 

1950 American television series debuts
1952 American television series endings
1950s American variety television series
Black-and-white American television shows
CBS original programming